Macropanesthia is a genus of cockroaches belonging to the family Blaberidae.

The species of this genus are found in Australia.

Species

Species:

Macropanesthia ferrugineipes 
Macropanesthia heppleorum 
Macropanesthia intermorpha

References

Blaberidae
Blattodea genera